In the Ulster Cycle of Irish mythology, Lóegaire Búadach (Lóegaire the Victorious) is a hapless Ulster warrior who mainly functions as comic relief. When he, Cúchulainn and Conall Cernach contend for the champion's portion at Briccriu's feast, Lóegaire is always a distant third. He lived at Inber Seimne (Larne, county Antrim).

His death-tale sums him up. When the poet Aed was to be drowned in a lake near Lóegaire's house for adultery with Conchobar's wife Mugain, he cried for help and Lóegaire rushed to the rescue. As he leaped out the door, he knocked the top of his own head off on the lintel. Still, he managed to kill thirty soldiers and save Aed's life before he died.

Texts
Bricriu's Feast
The Death of Lóegaire Búadach

References

Ulster Cycle